Bilal (born 1983) is a Lebanese singer of Nawari descent, who is notable for singing not only in Arabic, but mainly in Domari, his native language.

Background
Ban Bella El Hantir, also known as Bilal, the Arab Gipsy Prince, comes from the Dom people, a Romany Middle Eastern ethnic group that Gadjos call the "Nawar" in Arabic. Like most nomadic Domi families, Bilal's clan constantly moves from one place to another throughout the Middle East. To earn their wage during their stops, grown up men play musical instruments and sing, and women dance and tell good fortune. As for young boys, they often work as shoeshiners in large cities such as Damascus, Beirut and Istanbul.

Musical career
Bilal was a shoeshine boy when Greek-Lebanese producer Michel Elefteriades met him after he heard him singing an Arab Gipsy song while shining a customer's shoes on the sidewalk near his Beirut office. This was in 1997 and Bilal was only 14 years old. Elefteriades was immediately struck by his young voice and felt the artistic potential the young man had for future success. Moreover, being an eminent tziganologist, he was eager to launch a successful career for an artist who comes from the Dom community and to reflect its impact positively on the image of Gypsies around the Arab world. As Bilal was illiterate and had never been to school, Elefteriades started and supported both his general and musical education, also providing him with the necessary skills and assets that would enable him to put up with the stress and responsibilities of future stardom.

In 2002, Bilal started performing in concerts and was guest to major Arab TV shows on the Middle East's prime satellite television networks. The peak of his success story was his appearance at one of the most prestigious performing arts festival in the Arab world, the Baalbeck International Festival. Bilal's recordings include, for the first time in history, songs in the language known as Domari

In 2012 Bilal was a guest on Coke Studio (Middle East) alongside Rouwaida Attieh and The Yugoslavian Gypsy Brass Band from the Balkan.

They all come together to create a fusion where the Oriental Tarab music meets the Gypsy music with all its facets.

In 2014 Bilal was featured in the book "Beirut Re-Collected" by Tamyras.

In the summer of 2014, Bilal released his first album entitled: Bilal The Gipsy Prince.

In the summer of 2016, he performed at the MusicHallogy Festival, which was held at The MusicHall Waterfront.

In July 2017, he appeared in another prestigious performing arts festival in the Arab world, The Jounieh International Festival.

Activism
 

In addition to being an artist, Bilal is also working actively for the recognition of his people, the Dom, who still live in poor conditions. Results of his struggle are starting to show, as more people are realizing that the "Nawar" have a rich cultural heritage that deserves to be known and recognized.

References

External links
 Tannour – Bilal song on last.fm
 JENNO NOTTO – BILAL THE ARAB GIPSY PRINCE
 POUR UN FLIRT AVEC TOI – BILAL THE ARAB GIPSY PRINCE
 YA BENT EL SULTAN – BILAL THE ARAB GIPSY PRINCE

1983 births
Dom people
Living people
21st-century Lebanese male singers
Lebanese Romani people
Nawar people
Romani singers